Aleksandra Valentinovna Privalova (born 29 October 1987, Minsk) is a Belarusian table tennis player. She competed for Belarus at the 2012 Summer Olympics and the 2016 Summer Olympics.  In the women's singles at the 2012 Summer Olympics, she beat Han Xing in the first round before losing to Liu Jia in the second.

References

External links
 

Belarusian female table tennis players
Table tennis players at the 2012 Summer Olympics
Table tennis players at the 2016 Summer Olympics
Olympic table tennis players of Belarus
1987 births
Living people
Table tennis players at the 2015 European Games
European Games competitors for Belarus